The ninth season of Supernatural, an American dark fantasy television series created by Eric Kripke, premiered on October 8, 2013, concluded on May 20, 2014, and contained 23 episodes. This is the second season with Jeremy Carver as showrunner. The season was released on DVD and Blu-ray in region 1 on September 9, 2014, in region 2 on June 8, 2015, and in region 4 on October 8, 2014. The ninth season had an average viewership of 2.19 million U.S. viewers. The season follows Dean and Sam as they try to stop a revived Abaddon, a Knight of Hell, and have to use a cursed object called The First Blade to do so. Meanwhile, Metatron closes off heaven and causes the angels to fall, and Castiel will stop at nothing to stop him.

Cast

Starring
 Jared Padalecki as Sam Winchester / Gadreel
 Jensen Ackles as Dean Winchester
 Misha Collins as Castiel

Special guest stars
 DJ Qualls as Garth Fitzgerald IV
 Jim Beaver as Bobby Singer
 Leslie Jordan as the voice of Yorkie
 Nicole "Snooki" Polizzi as Herself / Crossroads Demon

Guest stars

Episodes

Production
On February 11, 2013, CW president Mark Pedowitz confirmed an early renewal of Supernatural for its ninth season, with the season premiere debuting on Tuesday, October 8, 2013. It was later confirmed, on February 25, 2013, that Misha Collins would return as a regular cast member, after being a special guest member for the previous two seasons. It was also announced that he would direct an episode in season 9.

A new character named Ennis was introduced in episode twenty of this season, which would serve as a backdoor pilot for Supernatural: Bloodlines. On May 8, 2014 it was announced that the spin-off had not been picked up by the CW Network.

Reception
The review aggregator website Rotten Tomatoes gives the 9th season a 100% approval rating based on 12 reviews, with an average score of 8.3/10. The critics consensus reads, "Even in its ninth season, Supernatural continues to thrill and fright as it moves the Winchester brothers in surprising new directions."

Notes

References

External links

Supernatural 09
2013 American television seasons
2014 American television seasons